Events from the year 1823 in Germany

Incumbents

Kingdoms 
 Kingdom of Prussia
 Monarch – Frederick William III of Prussia (16 November 1797 – 7 June 1840)
 Kingdom of Bavaria
 Maximilian I (1 January 1806 – 13 October 1825)
 Kingdom of Saxony
 Frederick Augustus I (20 December 1806 – 5 May 1827)
 Kingdom of Hanover
 George IV  (29 January 1820 – 26 June 1830)
 Kingdom of Württemberg
 William (30 October 1816 – 25 June 1864)

Grand Duchies 
 Grand Duke of Baden
 Louis I (8 December 1818 – 30 March 1830)
 Grand Duke of Hesse
 Louis I (14 August 1806 – 6 April 1830)
 Grand Duke of Mecklenburg-Schwerin
 Frederick Francis I– (24 April 1785 – 1 February 1837)
 Grand Duke of Mecklenburg-Strelitz
 George (6 November 1816 – 6 September 1860)
 Grand Duke of Oldenburg
Wilhelm (6 July 1785 – 2 July 1823 ) Due to mental illness, Wilhelm was duke in name only, with his cousin Peter, Prince-Bishop of Lübeck, acting as regent throughout his entire reign.
Peter I (2 July 1823 – 21 May 1829)
 Grand Duke of Saxe-Weimar-Eisenach
 Charles Frederick (14 June 1828 – 8 July 1853)

Principalities 
 Schaumburg-Lippe
 George William (13 February 1787 - 1860)
 Schwarzburg-Rudolstadt
 Friedrich Günther (28 April 1807 – 28 June 1867)
 Schwarzburg-Sondershausen
 Günther Friedrich Karl I (14 October 1794 – 19 August 1835)
 Principality of Lippe
 Leopold II (5 November 1802 – 1 January 1851)
 Principality of Reuss-Greiz
 Heinrich XIX (29 January 1817 – 31 October 1836)
 Waldeck and Pyrmont
 George II (9 September 1813 – 15 May 1845)

Duchies 
 Duke of Anhalt-Dessau
 Leopold IV (9 August 1817 – 22 May 1871)
 Duke of Brunswick
 Charles II (16 June 1815 – 9 September 1830)
 Duke of Saxe-Altenburg
 Duke of Saxe-Hildburghausen (1780–1826)  - Frederick
 Duke of Saxe-Coburg and Gotha
 Ernest I (9 December 1806 – 12 November 1826)
 Duke of Saxe-Meiningen
 Bernhard II (24 December 1803 – 20 September 1866)
Duke of Schleswig-Holstein-Sonderburg-Beck
Frederick William (25 March 1816 – 6 July 1825)

Events 
 10 February – The first worldwide carnival parade takes place in Cologne, Prussia.
 13 April – Franz Liszt, 11, gives a concert in Vienna, after which he is personally congratulated by Ludwig van Beethoven.

Births 
 4 April – Carl Wilhelm Siemens, German engineer (d. 1883)
 6 December – Friedrich Max Müller, German Orientalist (d. 1900)
 13 December – Ferdinand Büchner, German composer (d. 1906)

References

Years of the 19th century in Germany
Germany
Germany
1823 in Germany